
Gmina Obrzycko is a rural gmina (administrative district) in Szamotuły County, Greater Poland Voivodeship, in west-central Poland. Its seat is the town of Obrzycko, although the town is not part of the territory of the gmina.

Villages
Gmina Obrzycko contains the villages and settlements of Annogóra, Antoniny, Borownik, Brączewo, Bugaj, Chraplewo, Daniele, Dobrogostowo, Gaj Mały, Jaryszewo, Karczemka, Karolin, Kobylniki, Koźmin, Lizbona, Modrak, Nowina, Obrowo, Obrzycko-Zamek, Ordzin, Pęckowo, Piotrowo, Słopanowo, Słopanowo-Huby, Stobnicko and Zielonagóra.

Neighbouring gminas
Gmina Obrzycko is bordered by the gminas of Lubasz, Oborniki, Ostroróg, Połajewo, Szamotuły and Wronki.

References
Polish official population figures 2006

Obrzycko
Szamotuły County